Wintering Out (1972) is a poetry collection by  Seamus Heaney, who received the 1995 Nobel Prize in Literature.

Importance of Place

California/Liberation
The volume contains poems written between 1969 and 1971. Heaney wrote much of the collection while he was on sabbatical at the University of California, Berkeley, in 1971. Heaney has said that his time in California had a liberating effect on the form of his poetry: "In the poems of Wintering Out, in the little quatrain shapes, there are signs of that loosening, the California spirit, a more relaxed movement to the verse." Heaney writes explicitly about California in the poem "Westering."

Ireland
While the poems in Wintering Out are more formally open, they also demonstrate Heaney's intensifying commitment to rooting his poetry in the Irish landscape. Throughout the collection, Heaney uses linguistic cues and place names to develop a sense of community and forge a connection with the Irish past.  Poems like "Toome," "Broagh," and "Anahorish" are rich with allusions to Irish language and topography, while "Shore Woman" and "Maighdean Mara" draw on Irish folklore and proverbs. 
Heaney explained the importance of the Irish landscape in Wintering Out during an interview with literary critic Seamus Deane. Deane asked Heaney if he intended to create a "cultural landscape" with his poetry, and if Heaney insists "that this landscape be distinctly of this culture." Heaney responded: "Yes I think I came to this notion in the writing of the Wintering Out collection, particularly in the place name poems: 'Anahorish', 'Broagh', and so on. I had a great sense of release as they were being written, a joy and devil-may-careness, and that convinced me that one could be faithful to the nature of the English language ... and, at the same time, be faithful to one's own non-English origin ..." This quote shows that a sense of "place" was very important to Heaney in the formation of Wintering Out. As Heaney said, the place name poems were his mode for rooting the collection in Ireland, acknowledging his own origins, even while doing so in the English language.

Bogs
Wintering Out also contains one of Heaney's most important bog poems. In "Tollund Man," Heaney builds upon the image of the bog that he introduces in Door into the Dark's "Bogland." Heaney was deeply moved by P.V. Glob's study of the mummified Iron Age bodies found in Jutland's peat bogs. Bogs were a familiar feature of the Northern Irish landscape and Heaney found contemporary political relevance in the relics of the ritualistic killings.

Politics
In Wintering Out, Heaney grapples with the place of politics in his poetry.  In the late 1960s and early 1970s the sectarian violence of the Troubles was on the rise. Heaney felt pressure to act as a spokesperson for the Catholic minority of Northern Ireland.  He moved from Belfast to County Wicklow in the Republic of Ireland shortly after the publication of Wintering Out. In North, Heaney's next and most controversial volume, he returns to the bog bodies with more explicitly political poems.

Some critics, such as Eavan Boland of the Irish Times, applauded Heaney for his engagement with "mature" political themes. However, others expressed disappointment that Heaney did not do more to address the Troubles head on. The tension around how the poet wrote about the Troubles would continue to be of interest in the critical reception of following volumes like North published in 1975, and are the subject of several interviews with the poet himself such as Heaney's 1977 interview with Seamus Dean "Unhappy and at Home".

Heaney has been recorded reading this collection on the Seamus Heaney Collected Poems.

Contents 

 For David Hammond and Michael Longley
 Fodder
 Bog Oak
 Anahorish
 Servant Boy
 The Last Mummer
 Land
 Gifts of Rain
 Toome
 Broagh
 Oracle
 The Backward Look
 Traditions
 A New Song
 The Other Side
 The Wool Trade
 Linen Town
 A Northern Hoard 1. Roots
 A Northern Hoard 2. No Man's Land
 A Northern Hoard 3. Stump
 A Northern Hoard 4. No Sanctuary
 A Northern Hoard 5. Tinder
 Midnight
 The Tollund man
 Nerthus
 Cairn-maker
 Navvy
 Veteran's Dream
 Augury
 Wedding Day
 Mother of the Groom
 Summer Home
 Serenades
 Somnambulist
 A Winter's Tale
 Shore Woman
 Maighdean Mara
 Limbo
 Bye-Child
 Good-night
 First Calf
 May
 Fireside
 Dawn
 Travel
 Westering

External links
Seamus Heaney on NobelPrize.org

1972 poetry books
Irish poetry collections
Poetry by Seamus Heaney
Faber and Faber books